Edgar Bara (1876–1962) was a mandolinist, author and composer. He wrote the method book Méthode de Mandoline et Banjoline, published 1903 in the United States, one of the few from that era which is still in print today, in France. He was also a conductor of a  mandolin orchestra in Paris, the Cercle Mandoliniste in 1907.

Works
Lucia di Lammermoor
Une Nuit à Bone Sérénade algérienne (pour violon et piano) Op. 103
Une Fête à Séville, boléro
Les Hallebardiers passent! Retraite pour piano et mandoline Op. 48
La Veuve joyeuse, célèbre valse de Franz Lehar. Arrangée pour violon (ou mandoline) ou piano
La Traviata, opéra de Verdi. Fantaisie
La Norma, opéra de V. Bellini. Fantaisie pour mandoline et piano Op. 52
La Esméralda, piano
Indiscrétion, piano

See also
 List of mandolinists (sorted)

References

1876 births
1962 deaths
19th-century classical composers
19th-century French composers
19th-century French male musicians
20th-century classical composers
20th-century French composers
20th-century French male musicians
French classical composers
French classical mandolinists
French male classical composers